The 25th Golden Globe Awards, honoring the best in film and television for 1967, were held on 12 February 1968.

Winners and nominees

Film

Best Film - Drama
 In the Heat of the Night
Bonnie and Clyde
Far from the Madding Crowd
Guess Who's Coming to Dinner
In Cold Blood

Best Film - Comedy or Musical
 The Graduate
Camelot
Doctor Dolittle
The Taming of the Shrew
Thoroughly Modern Millie

Best Actor - Drama
 Rod Steiger - In the Heat of the Night
Alan Bates - Far from the Madding Crowd
Warren Beatty - Bonnie and Clyde
Paul Newman - Cool Hand Luke
Sidney Poitier - In the Heat of the Night
Spencer Tracy - Guess Who's Coming to Dinner (posthumous)

Best Actress - Drama
 Edith Evans - The Whisperers
Faye Dunaway - Bonnie and Clyde
Audrey Hepburn - Wait Until Dark
Katharine Hepburn - Guess Who's Coming to Dinner
Anne Heywood - The Fox

Best Actor - Comedy or Musical
 Richard Harris - Camelot
Richard Burton - The Taming of the Shrew
Rex Harrison - Doctor Dolittle
Dustin Hoffman - The Graduate
Ugo Tognazzi - Climax (L'immorale)

Best Actress - Comedy or Musical
 Anne Bancroft - The Graduate
Julie Andrews - Thoroughly Modern Millie
Audrey Hepburn - Two for the Road
Shirley MacLaine - Woman Times Seven
Vanessa Redgrave - Camelot

Best Supporting Actor
 Richard Attenborough - Doctor Dolittle
John Cassavetes - The Dirty Dozen
George Kennedy - Cool Hand Luke
Michael J. Pollard - Bonnie and Clyde
Efrem Zimbalist, Jr. - Wait Until Dark

Best Supporting Actress
 Carol Channing - Thoroughly Modern Millie
Quentin Dean - In the Heat of the Night
Lillian Gish - The Comedians
Lee Grant - In the Heat of the Night
Prunella Ransome - Far from the Madding Crowd
Beah Richards - Guess Who's Coming to Dinner

Best Director
 Mike Nichols - The Graduate
Norman Jewison - In the Heat of the Night
Stanley Kramer - Guess Who's Coming to Dinner
Arthur Penn - Bonnie and Clyde
Mark Rydell - The Fox

Best Screenplay
 In the Heat of the Night - Stirling Silliphant
Bonnie and Clyde - Robert Benton and David Newman
The Fox - Lewis John Carlino and Howard Koch
The Graduate - Buck Henry and Calder Willingham
Guess Who's Coming to Dinner - William Rose

Best Foreign Film (English language)
 The Fox • Canada
Accident • UK
The Jokers • UK
Smashing Time • UK
Ulysses • UK
The Whisperers • UK

Best Foreign Film (Foreign language)
Live for Life (Vivre pour vivre) • France
Elvira Madigan • Sweden
L'immorale • France/Italy
Closely Observed Trains (Ostre sledované vlaky) • Czechoslovakia
The Stranger (Lo straniero) • France

Best Music, Score
 Camelot - Frederick Loewe
Doctor Dolittle - Leslie Bricusse
Thoroughly Modern Millie - Elmer Bernstein
Two for the Road - Henry Mancini
Live for Life (Vivre pour vivre) - Francis Lai

Best Song
 "If Ever I Would Leave You" - Camelot
"Talk to the Animals" - Doctor Dolittle
"Circles in the Water" - Live for Life (Vivre pour vivre)
"Please Don't Gamble with Love" - Ski Fever
"Thoroughly Modern Millie" - Thoroughly Modern Millie

New Star of the Year (Male) 
Dustin Hoffman - The Graduate

New Star of the Year (Female) 
Katharine Ross - The Graduate

World Film Favorite (Male) 
Paul Newman

World Film Favorite (Female) 
Julie Andrews

Television

Best TV Show
Mission: Impossible 
The Carol Burnett Show
The Dean Martin Show
Garrison's Gorillas
Rowan & Martin's Laugh-In

Best TV Star - Male
 Martin Landau – Mission: Impossible
Brendon Boone – Garrison's Gorillas
Ben Gazzara – Run for Your Life
Dean Martin – The Dean Martin Show
Andy Williams – The Andy Williams Show

Best TV Star - Female
 Carol Burnett – The Carol Burnett Show
Barbara Bain – Mission: Impossible
Lucille Ball – The Lucy Show
Nancy Sinatra – Movin' with Nancy
Barbara Stanwyck – The Big Valley

References
IMdb 1968 Golden Globe Awards

025
1967 film awards
1967 television awards
1967 awards in the United States
February 1968 events in the United States